Live! In Chicago is a blues album by Kenny Wayne Shepherd Band.

Critical reception

On AllMusic, Steve Leggett wrote, "[Kenny Wayne Shepherd] does play a hot lead guitar – that, in a nutshell, is what he does. But over the years he's also learned that the blues isn't just about blazing lead licks, it's also about letting the song say its say – and on Live! In Chicago he does that.... This isn't a live album from some teenaged savant – it's an album from a grown man proud and honored to be playing the blues with some of his heroes. It also rocks."

Track listing
 "Somehow, Somewhere, Someway"
 "King's Highway"
 "True Lies"
 "Deja Voodoo"
 "Sell My Monkey" (with Buddy Flett)
 "Dance For Me Girl" (with Buddy Flett)
 "Baby, Don't Say That No More" (with Willie "Big Eyes" Smith)
 "Eye To Eye" (with Willie "Big Eyes" Smith)
 "How Many More Years" (with Bryan Lee)
 "Sick And Tired" (with Bryan Lee)
 "Feed Me" (with Hubert Sumlin)
 "Rocking Daddy" (with Hubert Sumlin)
 "Blue On Black"
 "I'm A King Bee"

Personnel
Kenny Wayne Shepherd - lead guitar, vocals
Scott Nelson - bass guitar
Chris Layton - drums
Riley Osbourne - Hammond B3, keyboards
Noah Hunt - lead vocals, rhythm guitar
Hubert Sumlin
Willie "Big Eyes" Smith
Bryan Lee
Buddy Flett

References

Kenny Wayne Shepherd albums
2010 live albums
Roadrunner Records live albums